The Wild Stallion is a 2009 American direct-to-DVD film directed by Craig Clyde and starring Miranda Cosgrove, Danielle Chuchran, Robert Wagner, Paul Sorvino, Connie Sellecca and Fred Ward. It was distributed by Myriad Pictures. In December 2010, the popular Horse Book Club PONY included The Wild Stallion in their package.

Plot 
Hanna Mills (Miranda Cosgrove), an 11-year-old girl from Cleveland, Ohio, wants to photograph wild horses for a project and to try to help save them. After visiting a ranch during summer vacation and befriending CJ (Danielle Chuchran), another 11-year-old girl, she learns about illegal activities that might jeopardize the mustangs. Along the way she learns about the horses including the legend of the black stallion.

Cast 
 Miranda Cosgrove as Hanna Mills
 Danielle Chuchran as C.J.
 Fred Ward as Frank Mills
 Manuel Ojeda as Jorge Valencia
 Connie Sellecca as Maddie
 Robert Wagner as Novak - The wild horse buyer
 Paul Sorvino as Sheriff Buck
 Corbin Allred as Depute Morg Haynes
 K. C. Clyde as Dallas Brody
 Gib Gerard as Ty Brody
 Carlisle Studer as Lilly
 RaeAnn Christensen as Ellie Reynolds
 Scotty Meek as Murdock
 Bob Lanoue as Virgil
 Michael Lawson as Alvin Niedermeyer - the cook
 Dustin Hunter Evans as Kyle

References

External links 

2009 direct-to-video films
2009 films
Films about horses
2009 drama films
2000s English-language films